In functional analysis and related areas of mathematics, a continuous linear operator or continuous linear mapping is a continuous linear transformation between topological vector spaces.

An operator between two normed spaces is a bounded linear operator if and only if it is a continuous linear operator.

Continuous linear operators

Characterizations of continuity

Suppose that  is a linear operator between two topological vector spaces (TVSs). 
The following are equivalent: 
 is continuous.
 is continuous at some point 
 is continuous at the origin in 

If  is locally convex then this list may be extended to include:
for every continuous seminorm  on  there exists a continuous seminorm  on  such that 

If  is a sequential space (such as a pseudometrizable space) then this list may be extended to include:
 is sequentially continuous at some (or equivalently, at every) point of its domain.

If  is pseudometrizable or metrizable (such as a normed or Banach space) then we may add to this list: 

If  is seminormable space (such as a normed space) then this list may be extended to include:
 maps some neighborhood of 0 to a bounded subset of 

for every  there exists some  such that 

Continuity and boundedness

Throughout,  is a linear map between topological vector spaces (TVSs). 

Bounded on a set

The notion of "bounded set" for a topological vector space is that of being a von Neumann bounded set. 
If the space happens to also be a normed space (or a seminormed space), such as the scalar field with the absolute value for instance, then a subset  is von Neumann bounded if and only if it is norm bounded; that is, if and only if  

Bounded linear maps

By definition, a linear map  between TVSs is said to be  and is called a  if for every (von Neumann) bounded subset  of its domain,  is a bounded subset of it codomain; or said more briefly, if it is bounded on every bounded subset of its domain. When the domain  is a normed (or seminormed) space then it suffices to check this condition for the open or closed unit ball centered at the origin. Explicitly, if  denotes this ball then  is a bounded linear operator if and only if  is a bounded subset of  if  is also a (semi)normed space then this happens if and only if the operator norm  is finite. Every sequentially continuous linear operator is bounded. 

Bounded on a neighborhood and local boundedness

In contrast, a map  is said to be  a point  or   if there exists a neighborhood  of this point in  such that  is a bounded subset of  
It is "" (of some point) if there exists  point  in its domain at which it is locally bounded, in which case this linear map  is necessarily locally bounded at  point of its domain. 
The term "" is sometimes used to refer to a map that is locally bounded at every point of its domain, but some functional analysis authors define "locally bounded" to instead be a synonym of "bounded linear operator", which are related but  equivalent concepts. For this reason, this article will avoid the term "locally bounded" and instead say "locally bounded at every point" (there is no disagreement about the definition of "locally bounded ").

Bounded on a neighborhood implies continuous implies bounded

A linear map is "bounded on a neighborhood" (of some point) if and only if it is locally bounded at every point of its domain, in which case it is necessarily continuous (even if its domain is not a normed space) and thus also bounded (because a continuous linear operator is always a bounded linear operator). 

For any linear map, if it is bounded on a neighborhood then it is continuous, and if it is continuous then it is bounded.  The converse statements are not true in general but they are both true when the linear map's domain is a normed space. Examples and additional details are now given below.

Continuous and bounded but not bounded on a neighborhood

The next example shows that it is possible for a linear map to be continuous (and thus also bounded) but not bounded on any neighborhood. In particular, it demonstrates that being "bounded on a neighborhood" is  always synonymous with being "bounded". 

This shows that it is possible for a linear map to be continuous but  bounded on any neighborhood. 
Indeed, this example shows that every locally convex space that is not seminormable has a linear TVS-automorphism that is not bounded on any neighborhood of any point. 
Thus although every linear map that is bounded on a neighborhood is necessarily continuous, the converse is not guaranteed in general.

Guaranteeing converses

To summarize the discussion below, for a linear map on a normed (or seminormed) space, being continuous, being bounded, and being bounded on a neighborhood are all equivalent. 
A linear map whose domain  codomain is normable (or seminormable) is continuous if and only if it bounded on a neighborhood. 
And a bounded linear operator valued in a locally convex space will be continuous if its domain is (pseudo)metrizable or bornological. 

Guaranteeing that "continuous" implies "bounded on a neighborhood"

A TVS is said to be  if there exists a neighborhood that is also a bounded set. For example, every normed or seminormed space is a locally bounded TVS since the unit ball centered at the origin is a bounded neighborhood of the origin. 
If  is a bounded neighborhood of the origin in a (locally bounded) TVS then its image under any continuous linear map will be a bounded set (so this map is thus bounded on this neighborhood ). 
Consequently, a linear map from a locally bounded TVS into any other TVS is continuous if and only if it is bounded on a neighborhood. 
Moreover, any TVS with this property must be a locally bounded TVS.

Any linear map from a TVS into a locally bounded TVS (such as any linear functional) is continuous if and only if it is bounded on a neighborhood. 
Conversely, if  is a TVS such that every continuous linear map (from any TVS) with codomain  is necessarily bounded on a neighborhood, then  must be a locally bounded TVS. 
In particular, a linear functional on a arbitrary TVS is continuous if and only if it is bounded on a neighborhood. 

Thus when the domain  the codomain of a linear map is normable or seminormable, then continuity will be equivalent to being bounded on a neighborhood.

Guaranteeing that "bounded" implies "continuous"

A continuous linear operator is always a bounded linear operator. 
But importantly, in the most general setting of a linear operator between arbitrary topological vector spaces, it is possible for a linear operator to be bounded but to  be continuous. 

A linear map whose domain is pseudometrizable (such as any normed space) is bounded if and only if it is continuous. 
The same is true of a linear map from a bornological space into a locally convex space. 

Guaranteeing that "bounded" implies "bounded on a neighborhood"

In general, without additional information about either the linear map or its domain or codomain, the map being "bounded" is not equivalent to it being "bounded on a neighborhood". 

Continuous linear functionals

Every linear functional on a topological vector space (TVS) is a linear operator so all of the properties described above for continuous linear operators apply to them. 
However, because of their specialized nature, we can say even more about continuous linear functionals than we can about more general continuous linear operators.

Characterizing continuous linear functionals

Let  be a topological vector space (TVS) over the field  ( need not be Hausdorff or locally convex) and let  be a linear functional on  
The following are equivalent:

 is continuous.
 is uniformly continuous on 
 is continuous at some point of 
 is continuous at the origin.
This is one of several reasons why many definitions involving linear functionals, such as polar sets for example, involve closed (rather than open) neighborhoods and non-strict  (rather than strict) inequalities.
 is bounded on a neighborhood (of some point). Said differently,  is a locally bounded at some point of its domain.
 Explicitly, this means that there exists some neighborhood  of some point  such that  is a bounded subset of  that is, such that  This supremum over the neighborhood  is equal to  if and only if  
 Importantly, a linear functional being "bounded on a neighborhood" is in general  equivalent to being a "bounded linear functional" because (as described above) it is possible for a linear map to be bounded but  continuous. However, continuity and boundedness are equivalent if the domain is a normed or seminormed space; that is, for a linear functional on a normed space, being "bounded" is equivalent to being "bounded on a neighborhood". 
 is bounded on a neighborhood of the origin. Said differently,  is a locally bounded at the origin. 
 The equality  holds for all scalars  and when  then  will be neighborhood of the origin. So in particular, if  is a positive real number then for every positive real  the set  is a neighborhood of the origin and  Using  proves the next statement when 
There exists some neighborhood  of the origin such that 
 This inequality holds if and only if  for every real  which shows that the positive scalar multiples  of this single neighborhood  will satisfy the definition of continuity at the origin given in (4) above.
 By definition of the set  which is called the (absolute) polar of  the inequality  holds if and only if  Polar sets, and thus also this particular inequality, play important roles in duality theory.
 is a locally bounded at every point of its domain.
There exists a continuous seminorm  on  such that 
 In particular,  is continuous if and only if the seminorm  is a continuous.
 is continuous, where  denotes the real part of 

If the domain  is a sequential space then this list may be extended to include:
 is sequentially continuous at some (or equivalently, at every) point of its domain.

If the domain  is metrizable or pseudometrizable (for example, a Fréchet space or a normed space) then this list may be extended to include:
 is a bounded linear operator (that is, it maps bounded subsets of its domain to bounded subsets of its codomain).

 is a bounded linear operator.
 is sequentially continuous at some (or equivalently, at every) point of its domain.
 is sequentially continuous at the origin.

and if in addition  is a vector space over the real numbers (which in particular, implies that  is real-valued) then this list may be extended to include:
There exists a continuous seminorm  on  such that 
For some real  the half-space  is closed.
For any real  the half-space  is closed.

Examples

Every linear map whose domain is a finite-dimensional Hausdorff topological vector space (TVS) is continuous. This is not true if the finite-dimensional TVS is not Hausdorff. 

Every (constant) map  between TVS that is identically equal to zero is a linear map that is continuous, bounded, and bounded on the neighborhood  of the origin. In particular, every TVS has a non-empty continuous dual space (although it is possible for the constant zero map to be its only continuous linear functional).

Suppose  is any Hausdorff TVS.

Properties

A locally convex metrizable topological vector space is normable if and only if every bounded linear functional on it is continuous.

A continuous linear operator maps bounded sets into bounded sets.

The proof uses the facts that the translation of an open set in a linear topological space is again an open set, and the equality

Properties of continuous linear functionals

Every non-trivial continuous linear functional on a TVS  is an open map. 
If  is a linear functional on a real vector space  and if  is a seminorm on  then  if and only if 

the supremum  can be written more succinctly as  because

If  is a scalar then

See also

References

  
  
  
  
  
  
  
  
  
  
  
  
  
  
  

Functional analysis
Linear operators
Operator theory
Theory of continuous functions